What's for Dinner? is the second studio album by garage rock band The King Khan & BBQ Show. The album was recorded in 2005 and released on October 10, 2006.

Track listing

References

2006 albums
The King Khan & BBQ Show albums
In the Red Records albums